Nagato may refer to:

Places 
 Nagato, Yamaguchi, a city in Yamaguchi prefecture, Japan
 Nagato, Nagano, a town in Nagano prefecture, Japan
 Nagato Province, one of the old provinces of Japan

People with the surname
, Japanese record producer, music arranger, writer and composer
 Hiroyuki Nagato, Japanese actor

Fictional characters:
 Yuki Nagato, a character in the Haruhi Suzumiya series
 Nagato or Pain (Naruto), an antagonist in the Naruto series

Other uses
 Japanese battleship Nagato, a battleship of the Imperial Japanese Navy

Japanese-language surnames